Carex otrubae, the false fox-sedge, is a species of flowering plant in the sedge family, Cyperaceae.

Description
Its utricles are either pale green or orange-brown.

Distribution and habitat
This species occurs in Europe, Central Asia, West Siberia, and Xinjiang, China. It thrives in wetlands on heavy soils and especially in lowland areas and can be found near lakes, rivers and reservoirs, as well as coastal areas.

References

otrubae
Flora of Europe
Flora of Asia
Plants described in 1922